Zhengyang County is a county in the southeast of Henan province, China. It is under the administration of the prefecture-level city of Zhumadian.

Administrative divisions
As 2012, this county is divided to 6 towns and 13 townships.
Towns

Townships

Climate

References

County-level divisions of Henan
Zhumadian